Anda Air, is an airline based in Kyiv, Ukraine. It operates charter services to Egypt, Jordan, and Turkey.

History 
The airline was established in 2015 and began operations in October 2016.

Destinations
Anda Air operates the following services (as of January 2017):

Albania
Tirana - Tirana International Airport

Egypt
Marsa Alam - Marsa Alam International Airport

Georgia
Batumi - Batumi International Airport
Tbilisi - Tbilisi International Airport

Jordan
Aqaba - King Hussein International Airport

Turkey
Antalya - Antalya Airport

Ukraine
Chernivtsi - Chernivtsi International Airport 
Kyiv - Kyiv International Airport (Zhuliany) Base
Kryvyi Rih - Kryvyi Rih Airport

Fleet
The Anda Air fleet comprises the following aircraft as of May 2022:

References

External links
Official website

Airlines of Ukraine
Charter airlines
Airlines established in 2015
Ukrainian companies established in 2015